Earias luteolaria is a moth of the family Nolidae first described by George Hampson in 1891. It is found in India, Sri Lanka, Borneo, Hong Kong and Australia.

Description
Fore-wings are bright yellowish with brown spot centrally. Hind-wings are whitish with a rusty-coloured outer area. On the underside of the hind-wings, a brown spot is found centrally.

References

Moths of Asia
Moths described in 1891
Nolidae